Klanjec is a small town in northwestern Croatia, in the region of Hrvatsko Zagorje on the border with Slovenia.

History
In the late 19th and early 20th century, Klanjec was a district capital in Varaždin County of the Kingdom of Croatia-Slavonia.

Population
The population of Klanjec is 567, but there are 2,543 people in the municipality (census 2021). The absolute majority were Croats at 98.8%.

Settlements
The list of settlements is as follows:

 Bobovec Tomaševečki, population 21
 Bratovski Vrh, population 67
 Cesarska Ves, population 14
 Dol Klanječki, population 91
 Florijan, population 7
 Goljak Klanječki, population 71
 Gorkovec, population 16
 Gredice, population 319
 Klanjec, population 567
 Ledine Klanječke, population 164
 Lepoglavec, population 139
 Letovčan Novodvorski, population 75
 Letovčan Tomaševečki, population 69
 Lučelnica Tomaševečka, population 212
 Mihanovićev Dol, population 319
 Novi Dvori Klanječki, population 241
 Police, population 235
 Rakovec Tomaševečki, population 130
 Tomaševec, population 158

International relations

Twin towns – Sister cities
Klanjec is twinned with:
 Wilamowice, Poland

References

Further reading

External links

 

Cities and towns in Croatia
Populated places in Krapina-Zagorje County
Varaždin County (former)